Ken or Kenneth McCracken may refer to:

 Kenneth G. McCracken (born 1938), Australian physicist
 Ken McCracken (rugby league), New Zealand rugby league player